The Jojo Yoki is a Czech single-place paraglider that was designed and produced by Jojo Wings of Roudnice nad Labem. It is now out of production.

Design and development
The Yoki was designed as an intermediate glider. The models are each named for their relative size.

Operational history
Reviewer Noel Bertrand noted the very low price of the Yoki in a 2003 review, saying "the prices are very interesting".

Variants
Yoki S
Small-sized model for lighter pilots. The glider model is AFNOR Standard certified.
Yoki M
Mid-sized model for medium-weight pilots. The glider model is AFNOR Standard certified.
Yoki L
Large-sized model for heavy-weight pilots.

Specifications (Yoki M)

References

Yoki
Paragliders